Warren Mercer (15 December 1941 – 26 August 1975) was an  Australian rules footballer who played with North Melbourne in the Victorian Football League (VFL).

Notes

External links 

1941 births
1975 deaths
Australian rules footballers from Victoria (Australia)
North Melbourne Football Club players